The Women competition at the 2022 World Allround Speed Skating Championships was held on 5 and 6 March 2022.

Results

500 m
The race was started on 5 March at 14:00.

3000 m
The race was started on 5 March at 15:05.

1500 m
The race was started on 6 March at 13:59.

5000 m
The race was started on 6 March at 15:30.

Overall standings
After all races.

References

Women